Ruslan Alekseyevich Ajinjal (born 22 June 1974) is a football coach and a former player from Abkhazia and a former Chairman of the Football Federation of Abkhazia. He is an assistant coach with FC Nizhny Novgorod. He is an identical twin brother of Beslan Ajinjal.

Career
On 12 June 2014, Ajinjal signed a one-year contract with Russian Premier League team FC Krasnodar. On 7 June 2015, Ajinjal announced his retirement.

President of the Football Federation of Abkhazia
On 8 September 2015, the Football Federation of Abkhazia announced that the upcoming leadership election had been moved forward to October from the Spring of 2016, so as to leave more time for the preparation of the 2016 ConIFA World Football Cup, hosted by Abkhazia. Ruslan Ajinjal became the only candidate for the post after incumbent Chairman Jemal Gubaz announced his immediate resignation on 21 September. On 15 October, Ajinjal was elected unanimously.

On 24 January 2017, Ajinjal resigned as Chairman, and on 25 February, the coach of Abkhazia's national football team Juma Kvaratskhelia was unanimously elected as his successor.

References

External links

1974 births
Living people
People from Gagra District
Footballers from Abkhazia
Soviet footballers
Russian footballers
FC Dinamo Sukhumi players
FC Baltika Kaliningrad players
FC Moscow players
FC Elista players
FC Akhmat Grozny players
FC Luch Vladivostok players
PFC Krylia Sovetov Samara players
FC Krasnodar players
Russian Premier League players
Russian twins
FC Volga Nizhny Novgorod players
Twin sportspeople
Association football midfielders